Charilaos "Charis" Papageorgiou (alternate spellings: Harilaos, Haris) (Greek: Χαρίλαος "Χάρης" Παπαγεωργίου; born March 26, 1953 in Thessaloniki, Greece) is a Greek retired professional basketball player. At a height of 1.95m (6 ft. 4  in.), he played at the small forward position.

Professional career
After playing with the youth clubs of Anagennisi from 1965 to 1971, Papageorgiou began his senior club career with the Greek League club Aris in 1971. In 1983, he moved to Faiakes Corfu. He then returned to Aris in 1985, before joining Ilysiakos in 1987.

National team career
Papageorgiou was a member of the senior men's Greek national basketball team. With Greece's senior national team, he had a total of 82 caps, and scored a total of 886 points, for a scoring average of 10.8 points per game. He played at the EuroBasket 1973, the EuroBasket 1979, and the EuroBasket 1981.

Post-playing career
After his playing career, Papageorgiou worked as the President of Aris Thessaloniki club.

Awards and accomplishments

Playing career
2× Greek League Top Scorer: (1976, 1979)
4× Greek League Champion: (1979, 1983, 1986, 1987)
Greek Cup Winner: (1987)

References

External links 
FIBA Profile
FIBA Europe Profile
Hellenic Basketball Federation Profile 

1953 births
Living people
Aris B.C. players
Greek basketball executives and administrators
Greek men's basketball players
Ilysiakos B.C. players
Small forwards
Basketball players from Thessaloniki